Argiope picta is a species of orb web spider found in tropical areas of Queensland, Australia and Papua New Guinea up to the Moluccas.
This species is similar in size to the sympatric Argiope aetherea; females can be distinguished from those of A. aetherea via extensive differences in abdominal colouration and patterns. The males of these two species are almost indistinguishable.

Little is known about the biology of A. picta. However, like most orb-web spiders, males are much smaller than females. Females of this species construct web decorations. Spiders from Australia mostly construct their decorations in a vertical line above and below the centre of the web (hub), whereas those from Papua New Guinea construct the characteristic “X” shape of St Andrew's Cross spiders. It is not known why these different decoration patterns appear in the same species, but it may be related to habitat differences.

Gallery

References

External links
Platnick, Norman I. (2007): The world spider catalog, version 8.0. American Museum of Natural History.

picta
Spiders of Australia
Spiders of Asia
Spiders described in 1871
Taxa named by Ludwig Carl Christian Koch